I & R Morley were a firm of hosiery manufacturers of Nottingham, England.

See also
 Samuel Morley (MP)
 Samuel Morley, 1st Baron Hollenden

References

External links 

Clothing brands
Clothing manufacturers
Manufacturing companies based in Nottingham